Big Chief is a British jazz band that also incorporates blues influences. The band is described by The Observer as "an institution as much as a band, bundling jazz, blues and soul in one bag and shaking them vigorously". Its members included saxophonist Dick Heckstall-Smith, and Tony Reeves.

Band members
Big Chief's current band members are as follows:
Edward Benstead - Trumpet
John Fry - Saxophone/Vocals
Tony Reeves - Bass
Tony Edwards - Percussion/Vocals
Barry Langton - Guitar
Steve Taylor - Drums
Chris Fry - Trombone
Adrian Paton - Keyboards/Vocals

Discography
It don't make sense (1997)
Steppin' Out (1999)
Big Chief Live at the Bull (2003)
Big Chief Live at the Dignity (2009)
Big Chief On Broadway (2010)

References

British jazz ensembles